Zulqarnain (born 25 May 1962) is a former Pakistani cricketer who played in three Test matches and 16 One Day Internationals from 1986 to 1989.

References

That's Cricket – Zulqarnain

1962 births
Living people
Pakistan Test cricketers
Pakistan One Day International cricketers
Pakistan Automobiles Corporation cricketers
Pakistani cricketers
Cricketers from Lahore
Lahore City cricketers
Lahore City Whites cricketers
Lahore City Blues cricketers
House Building Finance Corporation cricketers
Pakistan Railways cricketers
Pakistan Starlets cricketers
Wicket-keepers